The IEEE Transactions on Control Systems Technology is published bimonthly by the IEEE Control Systems Society. The journal publishes papers, letters, tutorials, surveys, and perspectives on control systems technology. The editor-in-chief is Prof. Andrea Serrani (Ohio State University). According to the Journal Citation Reports, the journal has a 2019 impact factor of 5.312.

References

External links
 

Transactions on Control Systems Technology
Control theory publications
Computer science journals
Publications established in 1993
Bimonthly journals
English-language journals